Penal labor in the United States is explicitly allowed by the 13th Amendment of the U.S. Constitution: "Neither slavery nor involuntary servitude, except as a punishment for crime whereof the party shall have been duly convicted, shall exist within the United States, or any place subject to their jurisdiction." The state can only work an inmate if he is sentenced to labor. Ref is Watson vs Graves 1990 note 7. Unconvicted detainees awaiting trial cannot be forced to participate in labor programs in prison as this would violate the Thirteenth Amendment.

Penal labor in the United States underwent many transitions throughout the late 19th and early and mid 20th centuries. Periods of national economic strife and security guided much of these transitions. Legislation such as the Hawes-Cooper Act of 1929 placed limitations on the trade of prison-made goods. Federal establishment of the Federal Prison Industries (FPI) in 1934 revitalized the prison labor system following the Great Depression. Increases in prison labor participation began in 1979 with the formation of the Prison Industry Enhancement Certification Program (PIECP). The PIECP is a federal program first authorized under the Justice System Improvement Act of 1979. Approved by Congress in 1990 for indefinite continuation, the program legalizes the transportation of prison-made goods across state lines and allows prison inmates to earn market wages in private sector jobs that can go towards tax deductions, victim compensation, family support, and room and board.

Firms including those in the technology and food industries are often provided tax incentives to contract prison labor, commonly at below market rates. The Work Opportunity Tax Credit (WOTC) serves as a federal tax credit that grants employers $2,400 for every work-release employed inmate. "Prison in-sourcing" has grown in popularity as an alternative to outsourcing work to countries with lower labor costs. A wide variety of companies such as Whole Foods, McDonald's, Target, IBM, Texas Instruments, Boeing, Nordstrom, Intel, Wal-Mart, Victoria's Secret, Aramark, AT&T, BP, Starbucks, Microsoft, Nike, Honda, Macy's and Sprint and many more actively participated in prison in-sourcing throughout the 1990s and 2000s.  After the 2021 storming of the US Capitol, it was noted that FPI would receive priority when the federal government purchases products such as office furniture to replace what was damaged in the riots.

Critics of the prison labor system argue that the portrayal of prison expansion as a means of creating employment opportunity is a particularly harmful element of the prison–industrial complex in the United States. Some believe that reducing the economic drain of prisons at the expense of an incarcerated populace prioritizes personal financial gain over ensuring payment of societal debt or actual rehabilitation of criminals. In 2021, inmates in federal prisons earned between $0.23 to $1.15 per hour, far below minimum wage ($7.25 per hour).

History

Origins 
The current state of prison labor in the United States has distinct roots in the slavery-era economy and society. With the passage of the 13th amendment in 1865, slavery was deemed unconstitutional. Involuntary servitude as a punishment for crime whereof the party shall have been duly convicted, was still explicitly allowed.

Prison labor post-13th amendment (1865–1866) 
Immediately following the abolition of slavery in the United States (and ratification of the 13th amendment), the slave labor-dependent economy of the South faced widespread poverty and market collapse. Southern lawmakers began to exploit the so-called "loophole" written in the 13th amendment and turned to prison labor as a means of restoring the pre-abolition free labor force. Black Codes were enacted by politicians in the South to maintain white control over former slaves, namely by restricting African Americans’ labor activity. Common codes included vagrancy laws that criminalized African Americans’ lack of employment or permanent residence. Inability to pay fees for vagrancy crimes resulted in imprisonment, during which prisoners labored in the very same wage-free positions held by slaves less than two years prior. Other "crimes" punishable by imprisonment (and subsequent slave labor) as per Black Codes included unlawful assembly, interracial relationships, violation of slave-like labor contracts, possession of firearms, making or selling liquor, selling agricultural produce without written permission from an employer, and practicing any occupation other than servant or farmer without holding a judge-ordered license. Additionally, orphaned minors and minors removed from their homes by the state were apprenticed by courts to employers until the age of 21. Minors apprenticed under Black Codes were authorized to be forced into labor against their will, and apprentice relationships closely resembled those of master and slave in terms of discipline and involuntary labor. By 1866, nearly all southern states had enacted individual sets of Black Codes. The widespread enforcement of Black Code laws effectively used the 13th amendment's exception of penal labor to reinvent the chattel slavery economy and society to comply with federal law.

Prison labor in the Reconstruction era (1866–1877) 
Between 1866 and 1869, Alabama, Texas, Louisiana, Arkansas, Georgia, Mississippi, and Florida became the first states in the U.S. to lease out convicts. Previously responsible for the housing and feeding of the new prison labor force, the states developed a convict leasing system as a means to rid penitentiaries of the responsibility to care for the incarcerated population. State governments maximized profits by putting the responsibility on the lessee to provide food, clothing, shelter, and medical care for the prisoners. Convict labor strayed from small-scale plantation and share crop harvesting and moved toward work in the private sector. States leased out convicts to private businesses that utilized the low-cost labor to run enterprises such as coal mines, railroads, and logging companies. Private lessees were permitted to use prisoner labor with very little oversight. The result was extremely poor conditions. Inadequacy of necessities like food, water, and shelter, was often exacerbated by unsafe labor practices and inhuman discipline. Nevertheless, the convict lease system prompted the southern economy's return from devastation as the (cheap) labor supply returned to southern capitalism.  

While incarceration rates continued to rise during Reconstruction, feeding the convict lease system, Union occupation in the South and national pressure began to change the laws by which African Americans were arbitrarily imprisoned. By 1868, the last official laws of Black Code were repealed in most states. As Reconstruction lost its vigor, however, the Democratic party recovered and de-stigmatized casual racism in the Union-washed South. This end to the reconstruction era set the stage for future reinvention of Black Code laws. States configured legislation to more precisely target the poor, further criminalizing the vast majority of former slaves who had not yet adapted to a free market or accrued wealth. Mississippi’s "pig law" followed this trend of hyper criminalization and fed the penal labor force simultaneously by tacking on outrageous sentences to violations. The "pig law" classified theft of a farm animal or any property worth $10 or more as grand larceny. Violation carried a sentence of incarceration up to five years. Following enactment of the "pig law," the incarcerated population quadrupled over the following three years.

Hired convict labor 
The earliest known law permitting convicts to be paid for their labor traces back to an act passed by New York governor John Jay in 1796. More explicit legislation suggesting that "it may be useful to allow [prisoners] a reasonable portion of the fruits of their labor" was later enacted in 1817 under Daniel D. Tompkins, only to be repealed the following year.

In 1924, the U.S. Secretary of Commerce, Herbert Hoover, held a conference on the "ruinous and unfair competition between prison-made products and free industry and labor" (70 Cong. Rec. S656 (1928)). The eventual legislative response to the committee's report led to federal laws regulating the manufacture, sale and distribution of prison-made products. Congress enacted the Hawes-Cooper Act in 1929, the Ashurst-Sumners Act in 1935 (now known as 18 U.S.C. § 1761(a)), and the Walsh-Healey Act in 1936. Walsh controlled the production of prison-made goods while Ashurst prohibited the distribution of such products in interstate transportation or commerce. Both statutes authorized federal criminal prosecutions for violations of state laws enacted pursuant to the Hawes-Cooper Act. Private companies got involved again in 1979, when Congress passed a law establishing the Prison Industry Enhancement Certification Program which allows employment opportunities for prisoners in some circumstances. PIECP relaxed the restrictions imposed under the Ashurst-Sumners and Walsh-Healey Acts, and allowed for the manufacture, sale and distribution of prisoner-made products across state lines. However, PIECP limited participation in the program to 38 jurisdictions (later increased to 50), and required each to apply to the U.S. Department of Justice for certification.

According to the International Labor Organization, in 2000–2011 wages in American prisons ranged between $0.23 and $1.15 an hour. In California, prisoners earn between $0.30 and $0.95 an hour before deductions.

Over the years, the courts have held inmates may be forced to work and are not protected by the constitution against involuntary servitude. They have also consistently held that inmates have no constitutional right to compensation and that inmates are paid by the "grace of the state." Under the Federal Bureau of Prisons, all
able-bodied sentenced prisoners were required to work, except those who participated full-time in education or other treatment programs or who were considered security risks. Correctional standards promulgated by the American Correctional Association provide that sentenced inmates, who are generally housed in maximum, medium, or minimum security prisons, be required to work and be paid for that work. Some states require, as with Arizona, all able-bodied inmates to work.

Inmates have reported that some private companies, such as Martori Farms, do not check for medical background or age when pulling women for jobs.

Modern prison labor systems
The following list is not comprehensive. All U.S. state prison systems and the federal system have some form of penal labor, although inmates are paid for their labor in most states (usually amounting to less than $1 per hour). As of 2017, Arkansas, Georgia, and Texas did not pay inmates for any work whether inside the prison (such as custodial work and food services) or in state-owned businesses. Additionally, Alabama, Florida, Mississippi, Oklahoma, and South Carolina allowed unpaid labor for at least some jobs.

Mississippi for-profit prison labor 
Forced labor exists in many prisons. In Mississippi, Parchman Farm operated as a for-profit plantation, which yielded revenues for the state from its earliest years. Many prisoners were used to clear the dense growth in the Mississippi bottomland, and then to cultivate the land for agriculture. By the mid-20th century, it had  under cultivation. In the late 20th century, prison conditions were investigated under civil rights laws, when abuses of prisoners and harsh working conditions were exposed. These revelations during the 1970s led the state to abandon the for-profit aspect of its forced labor from convicts and planned to hire a professional penologist to head the prison. A state commission recommended reducing the size of acreage, to grow only what is needed for the prison.

California Department of Corrections and Rehabilitation 
The 2017 Northern California wildfires consumed over 201,000 acres of land and took 42 lives. The state fire agency, California Department of Forestry and Fire Protection (CAL FIRE), mobilized over 11,000 firefighters in response, of which 1,500 were prisoners of minimum security conservation camps overseen by the California Department of Corrections and Rehabilitation. 43 conservation camps for adult offenders exist in California and 30 to 40% of CAL FIRE firefighters are inmates from these camps. Inmates within the firefighting programs receive two days off for every day they spend in the conservation camps and receive around US$2 per hour. Most California inmate programs inside of institutions receive a little over $0.25 to $1.25 per hour for labor. The inmate firefighter camps have their origins in the prisoner work camps that built many of the roads across rural and remote areas of California during the early 1900s.

Texas Department of Criminal Justice 
Responsible for the largest prison population in the United States (over 140,000 inmates) the Texas Department of Criminal Justice is known to make extensive use of unpaid prison labor. Prisoners are engaged in various forms of labor with tasks ranging from agriculture and animal husbandry, to manufacturing soap and clothing items. The inmates receive no salary or monetary remuneration for their labor, but receive other rewards, such as time credits, which could work towards cutting down a prison sentence and allow for early release under mandatory supervision. Prisoners are allotted to work up to 12 hours per day. The penal labor system, managed by Texas Correctional Industries, was valued at US$88.9 million in 2014. The Texas Department of Criminal Justice states that the prisoner's free labor pays for room and board while the work they perform in prison equips inmates with the skills and experience necessary to gain and maintain employment after they are released. Texas is one of the four states in the United States that does not pay inmates for their labor in monetary funds, with the other states being Georgia, Arkansas, and Alabama.

Georgia Department of Corrections 
Pat Biegler, director of the Georgia Public Works department stated that the prison labor system implemented in Georgia facilities saves the department around US$140,000 per week. The largest county prison work camp in Columbus, Georgia, Muscogee County Prison, saves the city around $17 to US$20 million annually according to officials, with local entities also benefiting from the monetary funds the program receives from the state of Georgia. According to Prison Warden of Muscogee County Prison, Dwight Hamrick, the top priority is to provide prison labor to Columbus Consolidated Government and to rehabilitate inmates, with all inmates being required to work. Inmates performing tasks related to sanitation, golf courses, recycling, and landfills receive a monetary compensation of around US$3 per day, while those in jobs such as facility maintenance, transportation, and street beautification do not receive any compensation.

Federal Prison Industries 
In 2007, Federal Prison Industries reportedly paid inmates from US$0.23 per hour up to a maximum of US$1.15 per hour to produce various goods, including furniture, body armor, and combat helmets. In the aftermath of the 2021 storming of the United States Capitol, it was noted that FPI would receive priority when the federal government purchases products such as office furniture to replace what was damaged in the riots.

Prison labor legislation

Federal Prison Industries (UNICOR or FPI) is a wholly owned United States government corporation created in 1934 that uses penal labor from the Federal Bureau of Prisons (BOP) to produce goods and services. FPI is restricted to selling its products and services to federal government agencies, with some recent exceptions.

The Prison Industry Enhancement Certification Program (PIECP) is a federal program that was initiated along with the American Legislative Exchange Council (ALEC) and the Prison-Industries Act in 1979. Before these programs, prison labor for the private sector had been outlawed for decades to avoid competition. The introduction of prison labor in the private sector, the implementation of PIECP, ALEC, and Prison-Industries Act in state prisons all contributed a substantial role in cultivating the prison-industrial complex. Between the years 1980 through 1994, prison industry profits jumped substantially from $392 million to $1.31 billion.

The Prison-Industries Act allowed third-party companies to buy prison manufactured goods from prison factories and sell the products locally or ship them across state lines. Through the program PIECP, there were "thirty jurisdictions with active [PIE] operations." in states such as Arizona, Arkansas, California, Colorado, Florida, Georgia, Hawaii, Idaho, Indiana, Iowa, Kansas, Louisiana, Maine, Maryland, Minnesota, and twelve others.

Response

Free Alabama Movement

Three prisoners – Melvin Ray, James Pleasant and Robert Earl Council – who led work stoppages in Alabama prisons in January 2014 as part of the Free Alabama Movement have been in solitary confinement since the start of the labor strike. Protests took place in three Alabama prisons, and the movement has smuggled out videos and pictures of abusive conditions, and authorities say the men will remain in solitary confinement indefinitely. The prisoners' work stoppages and refusal to cooperate with authorities in Alabama are modeled on actions that took place in the Georgia prison system in December 2010. The strike leaders argue that refusing to work is a tactic that would force prison authorities to hire compensated labor or to induce the prisoners to return to their jobs by paying a fair wage.  Prisoners appear to be currently organizing in Arizona, California, Florida, Illinois, Ohio, Pennsylvania, Mississippi, Texas, Virginia and Washington.

Council, one of the founders of the Free Alabama Movement, said: "We will not work for free anymore. All the work in prisons, from cleaning to cutting grass to working in the kitchen, is done by inmate labor. [Almost no prisoner] in Alabama is paid. Without us the prisons, which are slave empires, cannot function. Prisons, at the same time, charge us a variety of fees, such as for our identification cards or wrist bracelets, and [impose] numerous fines, especially for possession of contraband. They charge us high phone and commissary prices. Prisons each year are taking larger and larger sums of money from the inmates and their families. The state gets from us millions of dollars in free labor and then imposes fees and fines. You have [prisoners] that work in kitchens 12 to 15 hours a day and have done this for years and have never been paid."

Ray said "We do not believe in the political process ... We are not looking to politicians to submit reform bills. We aren't giving more money to lawyers. We don't believe in the courts. We will rely only on protests inside and outside of prisons and on targeting the corporations that exploit prison labor and finance the school-to-prison pipeline. We have focused our first boycott on McDonald's. McDonald's uses prisoners to process beef for patties and package bread, milk, chicken products. We have called for a national Stop Campaign against McDonald's. We have identified this corporation to expose all the others. There are too many corporations exploiting prison labor to try and take them all on at once."

Critics 
Executive Director of the Alliance for American Manufacturing, Scott Paul stated that "It's bad enough that our companies have to compete with exploited and forced labor in China. They shouldn't have to compete against prison labor here at home. The goal should be for other nations to aspire to the quality of life that Americans enjoy, not to discard our efforts through a downward competitive spiral."

Associate Editor of Prison Legal News, Alex Friedmann regards the prison labor system in the United States as part of a "confluence of similar interests" among corporations and politicians referring to the rise of a prison–industrial complex. He stated, "This has been ongoing for decades, with prison privatization contributing to the escalation of incarceration rates in the US."

Inmate strikes
From 2010 to 2015 and again in 2016 and 2018, some prisoners in the US refused to work, protesting for better pay, better conditions and for the end of forced labor. Strike leaders have been punished with solitary confinement.

The prison strikes of 2018, sponsored by Jailhouse Lawyers Speak and the Incarcerated Workers Organizing Committee (the latter a branch of the labor group Industrial Workers of the World) is considered by some observers  the largest in the country's history. In particular, inmates objected to being excluded from the 13th amendment which forces them to work for pennies a day, a condition they assert is "modern-day slavery."

Alternative policies and reform

Prison abolition movement 
Prison Industrial Complex Abolition, led by the Critical Resistance Movement, seeks to achieve the goal of eliminating imprisonment, policing and surveillance and create lasting effective alternatives to prison and punishment. Their approach to abolition is a broad strategy since they believe that the prison–industrial complex maintains oppression and inequalities through violence, punishment, and control over millions of incarcerated individuals. The organization strives to build better models for future strategies and views abolition as not only a practical organizing tool but also a long-term goal.

Prison labor contracts
In an effort to help inmates obtain employment post-release, legal scholars have argued that states should require in their contracts with private employers that the employer cannot have a policy that prohibits employing former prison inmates after they have been released.

See also
13th – Netflix documentary by Ava DuVernay which includes discussion of prison labor
Labor camp
Incarceration in the United States
Prison–industrial complex

References

 
Human rights in the United States
Unfree labor in the United States